Rhaphidospora cavernarum is a plant species in the family Acanthaceae. The species was thought to be extinct in Queensland until rediscovered on Cape York, between Cooktown and the Lockhart River. Previous to this, the species had not been seen since 1873.

References

Acanthaceae
Lamiales of Australia
Flora of Queensland
Extinct in the wild flora of Australia
Taxa named by Ferdinand von Mueller